Vincenzo de Siena (died 10 January 1578) was a Roman Catholic prelate who served as Bishop of Sarno (1573–1578).

Biography
Vincenzo de Siena was ordained a priest in the Order of Preachers. On 19 February 1573, he was appointed during the papacy of Pope Gregory XIII as Bishop of Sarno. He served as Bishop of Sarno until his death on 10 January 1578.

References

External links and additional sources
 (for Chronology of Bishops) 
 (for Chronology of Bishops) 

16th-century Italian Roman Catholic bishops
Bishops appointed by Pope Gregory XIII
1578 deaths